Salisbury is a hamlet located in the Town of Salisbury in Herkimer County, New York, United States.

References

Hamlets in Herkimer County, New York
Hamlets in New York (state)